Environment 2050 (A2050) was an environmentalist political party in Italy.

History
On 30 July 2022, Minister for Parliamentary Relations Federico D'Incà and Member of the Chamber of Deputies Davide Crippa left the Five Star Movement, who they had been members of since 2013, in disagreement with the party's decision to withdraw its support to the Draghi Cabinet.

On 1 August, Crippa and D'Incà founded Environment 2050, which Members of the Chamber of Deputies Maurizio Cattoi e Alessandra Carbonaro joined on the same day.

Crippa ran in the 2022 Italian general election as Civic Commitment's candidate in the Gugliano in Campania single-member district, but lost and wasn't re-elected.

The party has been inactive ever since, and operations are assumed to be permanently suspended.

Ideology
The party is referred to by its founders as progressive and environmentalist.

References

2022 establishments in Italy
Political parties established in 2022
Centre-left parties in Europe
Five Star Movement breakaway groups